Alibunar (German: Alisbrunn;) is a town and municipality located in the South Banat District of the autonomous province of Vojvodina, Serbia. Alibunar town and Alibunar municipality have a population of 2,883 and 19,780 respectively.

Name
In Serbian, the town is known as Alibunar or Алибунар, in Romanian as Alibunar, in German as Alisbrunn, in Hungarian as Alibunár, and in Turkish as Alipınar.

The name of the town derived from the Serbian loanword from Turkish "bunar" ("well" in English) and Muslim/Turkish personal name "Ali". According to the local legend, Alibunar was named after Ali-paša (Ali-pasha), who had a cattle and a well at this place. Even today, there is a well in the town which is known as "Ali-pašin bunar" ("well of Ali-paša").

Inhabited places

Alibunar municipality encompasses of town of Alibunar, town of Banatski Karlovac, and following villages:
Dobrica
Novi Kozjak
Ilandža
Seleuš
Vladimirovac
Janošik
Lokve  
Nikolinci

History
In this area, settlements existed in Neolithic, Bronze Age and Roman times. However, settlement appeared in historical sources in the 16th century. First recorded name of the settlement was Alijina Voda ("the water of Alija"), presumably named after its Muslim citizen Alija or Ali-paša, who had a house with stone well ("bunar" in Serbian) in the center of the settlement (hence the current name Alibunar or "the well of Ali"). After Ottomans were expelled from this region (in 1717), the settlement had 32 houses. 

In 1764, settlement was included into Illyrian (Serbian) regiment of Banatian Military Frontier, but in the next year, it was transferred to German regiment of this frontier. Before the inclusion into military frontier, Alibunar had ethnic Serb population, but after it became part of the frontier, 130 mostly Romanian and some 20-30 German families settled in this place. Serbs remained to live in older part of the settlement, Germans settled in its central parts and Romanians in northern parts. 

On May 17th and 18th, 1768, Emperor Joseph II came to Alibrunn during his tour of the Banat from Timișoara. He spent the night here and the next day, after visiting the Alibrunn Marshes, continued his journey to Tomasovác (Tamáslaka). The Serbian Orthodox church in the settlement was built in 1796.

Demographics

According to the 2011 census, the total population of the municipality of Opovo was 20,151 inhabitants.

Ethnic groups

Municipality
The population of the Alibunar municipality:
Serbs = 13,680 (59.59%)
Romanians = 6,076 (26.47%)
Slovaks = 1,195 (5.2%)
Romani = 657 (2.86%)
Hungarians = 309 (1.34%)

Settlements with a Serb ethnic majority are: Alibunar, Banatski Karlovac, Vladimirovac, Dobrica, Ilandža, and Novi Kozjak. The settlement with a Slovak ethnic majority is Janošik. The settlements with Romanian ethnic majority are: Lokve and Nikolinci. The ethnically mixed settlement with a relative Romanian majority is Seleuš.

The municipality of Alibunar contains the biggest ethnic Romanian community in Vojvodina.

Town
The population of the Alibunar town:
Serbs = 2,052 (59.81%)
Romanians = 960 (27.98%)
Romani = 87 (2.54%)
Hungarians = 61 (1.78%)
Slovaks = 46 (1.34%)
Macedonians = 43 (1.25%)
Yugoslavs = 42 (1.22%)

Famous citizens
Slobodan Bitević (*1988)

See also
List of places in Serbia
List of cities, towns and villages in Vojvodina

References
Jovan Erdeljanović, Srbi u Banatu, Novi Sad, 1992.
Slobodan Ćurčić, Broj stanovnika Vojvodine, Novi Sad, 1996.

Notes

External links

 Official site
 JP Turist Alibunar - official site
  Monografia Alibunarului 

 
Populated places in Serbian Banat
Populated places in South Banat District
Municipalities and cities of Vojvodina
Towns in Serbia